Brandýs nad Orlicí is a town in Ústí nad Orlicí District in the Pardubice Region of the Czech Republic. It has about 1,300 inhabitants. The historic town centre is well preserved and is protected by law as an urban monument zone.

Geography
It lies in the Svitavy Uplands. The town lies on the right bank of the Tichá Orlice river.

History

The first written mention is from 1227 when Loukoť, a part of Brandýs nad Orlicí, was mentioned. At the end of the 13th century, a large castle was built here. In the second half of the 15th century, Brandýs nad Orlicí became the significant centre of the Moravian Church. During the rule of the Pernštejn family in 1507, the castle was demolished.

From 1652 to 1806, the town was owned by the Trautmannsdorf family. The family had a castle and the Church of the Assumption of Jesus built here. In the second half of the 19th century, the railway was built and Brandýs nad Orlicí became a popular resort visited by many famous people. In 1898, the rehabilitation institute was established.

Transport
The main railway line between Pardubice and Česká Třebová runs through the town.

Sights
The Baroque Brandýs nad Orlicí Castle was built in 1781–1783. In 1818–1820 it was rebuilt in the Neoclassical style, and in 1914 in the Neo-Baroque style.

The ruins of the former Gothic castle are preserved and open to the public.

Notable people
John Jiskra of Brandýs (c. 1400 – c. 1469), strategist and mercenary soldier

References

External links

Cities and towns in the Czech Republic
Populated places in Ústí nad Orlicí District